Malignant Brain Tumor domain containing 1 is a protein that in humans is encoded by the MBTD1 gene. The gene is also known as SA49P01.

Model organisms

Model organisms have been used in the study of MBTD1 function. A conditional knockout mouse line, called Mbtd1tm2a(EUCOMM)Wtsi was generated as part of the International Knockout Mouse Consortium program — a high-throughput mutagenesis project to generate and distribute animal models of disease to interested scientists.
Male and female animals underwent a standardized phenotypic screen to determine the effects of deletion. Twenty four tests were carried out on mutant mice and two significant abnormalities were observed. Few homozygous mutant embryos were identified during gestation, and only one survived until weaning. The remaining tests were carried out on heterozygous mutant adult mice and no abnormalities were observed in these animals.

References

Further reading 
 

Human proteins
Genes mutated in mice